The Corpus Christi Public Libraries serve as the municipal library system of the city of Corpus Christi, Texas, USA.

Overview 
The Corpus Christi Public Libraries serve library patrons through the La Retama Central Library and five branch Libraries. The library collection includes over 375,400  items in a variety of formats, including books, audio compact discs, books-on-CD, downloadable audio books, DVDs, videocassettes, audiocassettes, large print books, electronic books, and over 200 magazine and newspaper subscriptions. Library patrons can also access a large suite of electronic databases from the TexShare consortium.

The La Retama Central Library is the designated Major Resource Center for the South Texas Library System.

Branches 
 Dr. Clotilde P. Garcia Public Library
 Ben F. McDonald Public Library
 Janet F. Harte Public Library
 Anita & W.T. Neyland Public Library (formerly Parkdale Branch Library)
 Owen R. Hopkins Public Library

References

External links
 Corpus Christi Public Libraries
 South Texas Library System

Public libraries in Texas
Education in Corpus Christi, Texas
Libraries participating in TexShare